KK (1968–2022) was an Indian playback singer. He has been a prominent singer in Hindi, Tamil, Telugu, Kannada, Malayalam, Marathi, Bengali and Gujarati language films.

Hindi/Bollywood Songs

1996

1997

1999

2000

2001

2002

2003

2004

2005

2006

2007

2008

2009

2010

2011

2012

2013

2014

2015

2016

2017

2018

2019

2020

2021

2022

2023

Film Songs in other languages

Tamil songs

Telugu songs

Kannada songs

Marathi songs

Bengali songs

Malayalam songs

Gujarati songs

Non-film songs in other languages

Assamese album songs

Albums

TV Title Songs

TV Performances

Other Non-Film Songs

References

External links

Lists of songs recorded by Indian singers